During the 2005–06 English football season, Brighton & Hove Albion F.C. competed in the Football League Championship.

Season summary
After survival the previous season, Brighton endured a poor 2005–06 Championship campaign and were relegated two games before the end of the season by losing 2–0 to Sheffield Wednesday which also sent Crewe Alexandra and Millwall down with them.

Final league table

Results
Brighton & Hove Albion's score comes first

Legend

Football League Championship

FA Cup

League Cup

Squad

Left club during season

References

Brighton & Hove Albion F.C. seasons
Brighton and Hove Albion